Silver King may refer to:

People
Silver King (baseball), Charles Koenig, professional baseball player from the 19th century
Silver King (wrestler) (1968–2019), Mexican wrestler
The nickname for Tom Norman, the owner of the freak show that exhibited the "Elephant Man"

Other
Silver King, Fred Thomson's horse, who featured in many Westerns with the 1920s movie star
Silver King bicycle, produced by George M. Hendee starting in 1892
FV Silver King, a Canadian fishing vessel which sunk in 1967
Silver King Creek, a tributary of the Carson River, northwestern Nevada
Another name for the Atlantic tarpon, a ray-finned fish
The broadcast television arm of the Home Shopping Network, which later became USA Broadcasting

See also
The Silver King (disambiguation)